Braunston London Road was one of two railway stations that served the village of Braunston in Northamptonshire, England. The station was built on the Weedon to Leamington Spa branch line on an embankment next to the village's wharf on the Grand Union Canal after the demolishing of a number of houses and a pub that were in the way.

The station opened along with the Leamington extension of the Weedon line on 1 August 1895. It was on a passing loop and originally had two platforms with an underpass linking them, however the second platform was later taken out of use and removed, so trains in both directions called at the same platform, although the loop was retained for goods traffic until the line closed.

The station was originally known as just Braunston, however it was renamed as Braunston London Road in 1950, to differentiate it from the other station serving the village. Despite its small size, Braunston was also served by Braunston and Willoughby station on the former Great Central Main Line, which served Braunston and the village of Willoughby, which it was closer to.

The line closed to passengers in 1958, and freight in 1963.

Little now remains of the station, although the embankment where it stood can still be seen.

References

External links 
 Braunston station on navigable 1954 O. S. map
 Braunston Station on Warwickshire Railways
 LNWR Map

Disused railway stations in Northamptonshire
Railway stations in Great Britain opened in 1895
Railway stations in Great Britain closed in 1958
Former London and North Western Railway stations
West Northamptonshire District